Cabell Midland High School is located in Ona, West Virginia. Cabell Midland is a four-year high school which serves grades 9 through 12. The school's name is derived from two sources; "Cabell" for the county in which it is located, and "Midland" for the famous Midland Trail which once extended from Norfolk, Virginia to Los Angeles, California.

Overview
The school serves students predominantly from the eastern part of Cabell County from Barboursville Middle School and Milton Middle School. The building was constructed in 1994 through of the consolidation of Barboursville High School and Milton High School. The approximately  building was designed by the Charleston, West Virginia architectural firm of Williamson Shriver Architects. The design received an Honor Award for Architectural Excellence from the West Virginia Chapter of the American Institute of Architects (AIA-WV) in 1995. The temporary name of the school during the planning stages was Cabell East High School, but after asking for input and ideas from the public, the official name of Cabell Midland High School was later decided on by the Cabell County Board Of Education. The name of the other public high school in Cabell County, Huntington High School (which combined "Old" Huntington High School and Huntington East High School), went through the same process, originally being called Cabell West High School, then Huntington Summit High School, and finally Huntington High School.

Student body
Cabell Midland, with an enrollment of 1,834 as of 2012, was and is the largest student body in the state and among the largest 15% of schools in the country. The population was 51% male; 97.8% White, 0.8% Black, 0.8% Asian, 0.4% Hispanic, and 0.2% American Indian. The student-to-teacher ratio was 17.9, ranking 116th of the 159 secondary schools in the state. In the 2016-2017 school year, CMHS boasted 1,971 students and 114 faculty members.

As of the 2018-2019 school year, Cabell Midland's student enrollment is 1,857, along with a faculty comprising 195 employees.

Athletics
CMHS is a member of the Mountain State Athletic Conference (MSAC) and competes in the state's "large school" division of AAAA.

Mascot and school colors
Cabell Midland's mascot is the Scarlet Knight, which was chosen via a poll of the students of Milton and Barboursville high schools in 1993.  the two that consolidated to form Cabell Midland. The school colors are scarlet and silver.

Notable alumni
Jarred Cannon, member of the West Virginia House of Delegates
Katie Lee: food critic, chef; third wife of Billy Joel
Jason Starkey: NFL player

References
4. https://web.archive.org/web/20190419191555/http://www.cabellschools.com/about/district_history/public_schools/cabell_midland_high_school

External links
 Official Website of Cabell Midland High School

Public high schools in West Virginia
Schools in Cabell County, West Virginia
Educational institutions established in 1994
1994 establishments in West Virginia